Wheeling station could refer to:

 Wheeling station (Illinois) in Wheeling, Illinois, United States
 Wheeling station (West Virginia) in Wheeling, West Virginia, United States